This article contains information about the literary events and publications of 1932.

Events
March – Captain W. E. Johns' character Biggles (James Bigglesworth) is introduced as an English World War I pilot in the short story "The White Fokker", in the first, April issue of Popular Flying magazine, edited by Johns. The first Biggles collection, The Camels Are Coming, ensues in April.
April 23 – To mark Shakespeare's birthday:
The Royal Shakespeare Company's new theatre opens at Stratford-upon-Avon.
The Folger Shakespeare Library opens in Washington, D.C.
April 26 – The 32-year-old American poet Hart Crane, in a state of alcoholic depression, throws himself overboard from the Orizaba between Mexico and New York; his body is never recovered.
May – The first issue appears of the English journal of literary criticism Scrutiny: a quarterly review, edited by F. R. Leavis.
June 28 – Alice Hargreaves, the inspiration for Alice's Adventures in Wonderland, meets the publisher Peter Llewelyn Davies, the inspiration for Peter Pan, at a Lewis Carroll centenary exhibition in a London bookshop.
July – W. B. Yeats leases Riversdale house in the Dublin suburb of Rathfarnham and publishes Words for Music Perhaps, and Other Poems.
Summer
The Open Air Theatre, Regent's Park, is established as a regular venue in London by Sydney Carroll and Robert Atkins.
The first performances at the Minack Theatre, an open-air venue on the coast of Cornwall (England), include The Tempest.
October 3 – The Times newspaper of London introduces the Times New Roman typeface devised by Stanley Morison.
November 16 – Compton Mackenzie is prosecuted under the Official Secrets Act in the U.K. for material in his Greek Memories.
October – Nineteen Irish writers led by Yeats and George Bernard Shaw form an Academy of Irish Letters that opposes the Censorship of Publications Board.
December 
E. V. Knox replaces Sir Owen Seaman as editor of Punch magazine.
Shortly after publication, the first copies of Graham Greene's novel Stamboul Train, published by Heinemann in London, are withdrawn and the text altered after a threat of libel action by J. B. Priestley.
unknown dates
Samuel Beckett's first novel, Dream of Fair to Middling Women, is written in Paris and rejected by several publishers.
Serialisation of the first three volumes of Mikhail Sholokhov's novel And Quiet Flows the Don («Тихий Дон») concludes in the Soviet magazine October.
The New Poetry (Thơ mới) period begins in Vietnamese literature, marked by an article and a poem from Phan Khôi.
Aussie: The Australian Soldiers' Magazine ceases publication.
Una Dillon founds Dillons Booksellers in London.

New books

Fiction
Laura Adams Armer – Waterless Mountain
Henry Bellamann – The Richest Woman in Town
E.F. Benson – Secret Lives
Phyllis Bentley – Inheritance
Gerald Tyrwhitt-Wilson, 14th Baron Berners (as Adela Quebec) – The Girls of Radcliff Hall (privately circulated roman à clef)
Hermann Broch – The Sleepwalkers (Die Schlafwandler, trilogy completed)
Lynn Brock – Nightmare
John Buchan – The Gap in the Curtain
Pearl S. Buck – Sons
Edgar Rice Burroughs – Tarzan Triumphant
Erskine Caldwell – Tobacco Road
Morley Callaghan – A Broken Journey
John Dickson Carr
Poison in Jest
The Waxworks Murder
Louis-Ferdinand Céline – Journey to the End of the Night (Voyage au bout de la nuit)
Agatha Christie
Peril at End House
The Thirteen Problems
Colette – The Pure and the Impure (Le Pur et l'impur)
John Creasey – Seven Times Seven
 Freeman Wills Crofts 
 Death on the Way
 Sudden Death
A. J. Cronin – Three Loves
Clemence Dane – Re-enter Sir John
Catherine Isabella Dodd – Paul and Perdita
John Dos Passos – 1919
Hans Fallada – Little Man, What Now? (Kleiner Mann, was nun?)
 Joseph Jefferson Farjeon – The Z Murders
William Faulkner – Light in August
Lion Feuchtwanger – Josephus
Rudolph Fisher – The Conjure Man Dies: A Mystery Tale of Dark Harlem
Elena Fortún – Celia en el colegio
Gilbert Frankau – Christopher Strong
Lewis Grassic Gibbon – Sunset Song
Stella Gibbons – Cold Comfort Farm
Anthony Gilbert 
 The Body on the Beam
 The Long Shadow
Jean Giono – Blue Boy
Ellen Glasgow – The Sheltered Life
Graham Greene – Stamboul Train
Ernst Haffner – Blood Brothers (Blutsbrüder)
Hermann Hesse – Journey to the East (Die Morgenlandfahrt)
Pamela Hinkson – The Ladies' Road
Soeman Hs – Mentjahari Pentjoeri Anak Perawan
Aldous Huxley – Brave New World
Francis Iles (Anthony Berkeley Cox) – Before the Fact
Margaret Kennedy – A Long Time Ago
Irmgard Keun – The Artificial Silk Girl (Das kunstseidene Mädchen)
Marie Belloc Lowndes – Jenny Newstead
W. Somerset Maugham – The Narrow Corner
Gladys Mitchell – The Saltmarsh Murders
Nancy Mitford – Christmas Pudding
Abdul Muis – Pertemuan Jodoh
Vladimir Nabokov
Glory
Laughter in the Dark
Beverley Nichols – Evensong
Charles Nordhoff and James Norman Hall – Mutiny on the Bounty	
Max Nomad – Rebels and Renegades
Seán Ó Faoláin – Midsummer Night Madness and Other Stories
E. Phillips Oppenheim – The Ostrekoff Jewels
Edith Philips – The Good Quaker in French Legend
Anthony Powell – Venusberg
John Cowper Powys – A Glastonbury Romance
Ellery Queen
The Greek Coffin Mystery
The Egyptian Cross Mystery
Sax Rohmer – The Mask of Fu Manchu
Joseph Roth – Radetzky March (Radetzkymarsch)
Damon Runyon – Guys and Dolls
Rafael Sabatini – The Black Swan
Dorothy L. Sayers – Have His Carcase
Israel Joshua Singer – Yoshe Kalb
J. Slauerhoff – Het verboden rijk (The Forbidden Kingdom, serial publication concludes and first book publication)
Eleanor Smith – Ballerina
Thorne Smith – Topper Takes a Trip
Lesbia Soravilla – El dolor de-vivir
John Steinbeck – The Pastures of Heaven
Julia Strachey – Cheerful Weather for the Wedding
Cecil Street – Dead Men at the Folly
Thomas Sigismund Stribling – The Store
Margareta Suber – Charlie
Phoebe Atwood Taylor – Death Lights a Candle
Wallace Thurman – Infants Of The Spring
G. E. Trevelyan – Appius and Virginia
Sigrid Undset
Burning Bush
The Son Avenger
Maxence Van Der Meersch – The House on the Dune
 Henry Wade – The Hanging Captain
Hugh Walpole – The Fortress
Evelyn Waugh – Black Mischief
Charles Williams – The Greater Trumps
S. Fowler Wright
Beyond the Rim
The New Gods Lead (short stories)
Francis Brett Young – The House Under the Water

Children and young people
Laura Adams Armer – Waterless Mountain
W. E. Johns – The Camels Are Coming
Arthur Ransome – Peter Duck
Alison Uttley – Moonshine and Magic
Laura Ingalls Wilder – Little House in the Big Woods
Ruth Plumly Thompson – The Purple Prince of Oz (26th in the Oz series overall and the 12th written by her)

Drama
S. N. Behrman – Biography
Elias Canetti – Hochzeit (Wedding)
Noël Coward – Design for Living
Walter C. Hackett – Road House
Ian Hay – Orders Are Orders
Anthony Kimmins – While Parents Sleep
Edward Knoblock – Evensong
Ferdinand Kwasi Fiawoo – Toko Atolia
George S. Kaufman and Edna Ferber – Dinner at Eight
W. Somerset Maugham – For Services Rendered
 Harrison Owen – Doctor Pygmalion
Ahmed Shawqi – Amirat el-Andalus (The Andalusian Princess)
John Van Druten 
Behold, We Live
Somebody Knows
Ödön von Horváth – Kasimir und Karoline

Poetry

W. H. Auden – The Orators
Cecil Day-Lewis – From Feathers To Iron
An "Objectivist's" Anthology
Boris Pasternak – The Second Birth

Non-fiction
Adrian Bell – The Cherry Tree
Henri Bergson – The Two Sources of Morality and Religion (Les deux sources de la morale et de la religion)
Emil Brunner – The Divine Imperative: a study in Christian ethics (Gebot und die Ordnungen)
F. J. Harvey Darton – The Story of English Children's Books in England: Five Centuries of Social Life
Bernard DeVoto – Mark Twain's America
Annabel Jackson – A Victorian Childhood
T. S. Eliot – Selected Essays, 1917-1932
J. B. S. Haldane – The Causes of Evolution
Kepelino (died c. 1878) – Kepelino's Traditions of Hawaii (translation of Moolelo Hawaii, 1868)
Hugh Kingsmill – Frank Harris
F. R. Leavis – New Bearings in English Poetry
Q. D. Leavis – Fiction and the Reading Public
Maxwell House Haggadah
Beverley Nichols – Down the Garden Path
Walter B. Pitkin – Life Begins at Forty
Stith Thompson – Motif-Index of Folk-Literature (begins publication)
E. C. Titchmarsh – The Theory of Functions
Florence White – Good Things in England (food)
S. Fowler Wright – The Life of Sir Walter Scott

Births

January 2 – Jean Little, Canadian children's fiction author (died 2020)
January 5 – Umberto Eco, Italian novelist and semiotician (died 2016)
January 18 – Robert Anton Wilson, American novelist and playwright (died 2007)
January 19 – George MacBeth, Scottish poet and novelist (died 1992)
February 7 – Gay Talese, American literary journalist
February 15 – Troy Kennedy Martin, Scottish scriptwriter (died 2009)
February 16 – Aharon Appelfeld, Israeli novelist and poet (died 2018)
February 20 – Adrian Cristobal, Filipino journalist, playwright and author (died 2007)
March 4 – Ryszard Kapuściński, Polish journalist, traveller, poet and writer (died 2007)
March 18 – John Updike, American novelist and poet (died 2009)
March 31 – John Jakes, American historical novelist
 8 April – Joan Lingard, Scottish writer (died 2022)
April 10 – Adrian Henri, English poet (died 2000)
May 7 – Jenny Joseph, English poet (died 2018)
May 8 – Julieta Campos, Cuban-Mexican author and translator (died 2007)
May 24 – Arnold Wesker, English dramatist (died 2016)
June 5 – Christy Brown, Irish autobiographer and poet (died 1981)
June 6 – Sara Banerji, English author and sculptor
June 18 – Geoffrey Hill, English poet (died 2016)
July 17 – Karla Kuskin, American children's writer and illustrator (died 2009)
July 18 – Yevgeny Yevtushenko, Russian poet and writer (died 2017)
August 16 – Christopher Okigbo, Nigerian poet (died 1967)
August 17 – V. S. Naipaul, Trinidad-born novelist (died 2018)
August 27 – Antonia Fraser, English biographer, novelist and historian
September 7 – Malcolm Bradbury, English novelist (died 2000)
September 9 – Alice Thomas Ellis, English novelist, essayist and cookery book author (died 2005)
October 24 – Adrian Mitchell, English poet, playwright and fiction writer (died 2008)
October 27 – Sylvia Plath, American poet (suicide 1963)
October 31 – Katherine Paterson, Chinese-American author

Deaths
January 6 – Iacob Negruzzi, Romanian poet, columnist and memoirist (born 1842)
January 12 – Ella Hepworth Dixon, English writer, novelist and editor (born 1857)
January 21 – Lytton Strachey, English biographer (cancer, born 1880)
January 28 – F. M. Mayor, English novelist (born 1872)
February 4 – Mona Caird, English novelist, essayist and feminist (born 1854)
February 10 – Edgar Wallace, English crime writer (diabetes, born 1875)
February 15 – Minnie Maddern Fiske, American actress and playwright (born 1865)
March 16 – Harold Monro, British poet and poetry bookshop proprietor (alcohol-related, born 1879)
April 20 – Giuseppe Peano, Italian mathematician and philosopher (born 1858)
April 22 – Ferenc Oslay, Hungarian-Slovene historian, writer and irredenta (born 1883)
April 23
Evelyn Everett-Green, English novelist and children's writer (born 1856)
Laura Kieler, Norwegian novelist and dramatic inspiration (born 1849)
April 27 – Hart Crane, American poet (suicide, born 1899)
May 22 – Augusta, Lady Gregory, Irish dramatist (born 1852)
June 17 – Sir John Quick, Australian politician and author (born 1852)
July 6 – Kenneth Grahame, Scottish-born children's and short-story writer (born 1859)
July 20 – René Bazin, French novelist (born 1853)
July 22 – J. Meade Falkner, English novelist and poet (born 1858)
July 23 – Emma Pow Bauder, American novelist, evangelist, missionary, and reformer (born 1848)
August 29 – Raymond Knister, Canadian writer (drowned, born 1899)
September 5 – Paul Bern, German-American screenwriter (suicide, born 1889)
September 24 – Rose Combe, French writer and railway worker (born 1883)
October 5 – Christopher Brennan, Australian poet (born 1870)
October 14 – Ahmed Shawqi, Egyptian poet (born 1868)
November 11 – Georgina Fraser Newhall, Canadian author (b. 1860)
November 13 – Catherine Isabella Dodd, English education writer and novelist (born 1860)
November 15 – Charles W. Chesnutt, American writer (born 1858)
November 23 – Henry S. Whitehead, American genre novelist (gastric ailment, born 1882)
date unknown — Hester M. Poole, American writer, poet, art critic (born 1833/34)

Awards
James Tait Black Memorial Prize for fiction: Helen de Guerry Simpson, Boomerang
James Tait Black Memorial Prize for biography: Stephen Gwynn, The Life of Mary Kingsley
Newbery Medal for children's literature: Laura Adams Armer, Waterless Mountain
Nobel Prize in literature: John Galsworthy
Prix Goncourt: Guy Mazeline, Les Loups
Pulitzer Prize for Drama: George S. Kaufman, Morrie Ryskind, Ira Gershwin, Of Thee I Sing
Pulitzer Prize for Poetry: George Dillon, The Flowering Stone
Pulitzer Prize for the Novel: Pearl S. Buck, The Good Earth

References

 
Years of the 20th century in literature